Hopeahainol A is a polyphenol acetylcholinesterase inhibitor with the molecular formula C56H42O12. Hopeahainol A has been isolated from the tree Hopea hainanensis. Hopeahainol A may be used for the treatment of Alzheimer's disease.

References

Further reading 

 
 

polyphenol
Acetylcholinesterase inhibitors
Heterocyclic compounds with 4 rings
Oxygen heterocycles